The women's team competition of the synchronized swimming events at the 2015 Pan American Games in Toronto was held from July 9 to July 11, at the Toronto Pan Am Sports Centre. The defending Pan American Champion was the team from Canada.

Eight teams competed, each consisting of eight swimmers. There is only a single round of competition. Each team presented two routines: the technical routine and the free routine. The technical routine consists of twelve required elements, which must be completed in order and within a time of between 2 minutes 35 seconds and 3 minutes 5 seconds. The free routine has no restrictions other than time; this routine must last between 3 minutes 45 seconds and 4 minutes 15 seconds.

Schedule
All times are local Eastern Daylight Time (UTC−4)

Results

References

Synchronized swimming at the 2015 Pan American Games